The Men's 10 m synchro platform competition of the 2016 European Aquatics Championships was held on 12 May 2016.

Results
The final was held at 19:30.

References

Diving